Mwamgongo is an administrative ward in Kigoma District of Kigoma Region in Tanzania. 
According to the 2012 census, the ward has a total population of 15,657.

References

Wards of Kigoma Region